Alessandro Crescenzi (born 25 September 1991) is an Italian professional footballer who plays as a full-back for  club Pescara.

Club career

Roma
Crescenzi is a product of the Roma youth system. He is an attacking right back, with the ability to play also on the left side.

On 15 March 2009, he made his debut for the senior team at a young 17 years of age, in a Serie A match against Sampdoria.

In summer 2009, he was loaned out for one season to Serie B side Grosseto. In 2010, he was loaned to Serie B club Crotone, where he played as a starter on the right back position.

Bari
On 5 August 2011, Crescenzi joined Bari on a season-long loan deal that brought teammates Simone Sini and Adrian Stoian to the team as well. The loan also inserted a co-ownership option and Crescenzi also extended his contract to 2014 in order to formalize the deal. He would earn a gross annual salary of €177,000 in 2013–14 season. On 24 August his teammate Salvatore Masiello threw a plate that hit Crescenzi in the arm, necessitating 40 stitches and leading Bari to seek the termination of Masiello's contract.

Pescara
During the summer 2012 he joined on loan Serie A club Pescara.

Novara
On 25 January 2013, Crescenzi signed for Serie A club Novara on a loan spell.

Ajaccio
He returned to Roma for 2013–14 season, but was loaned to AC Ajaccio. After 9 games in Ligue 1 and two in French Cups, he was sent back to A.S. Roma in January 2014.

Cremonese
On 28 January 2020, he joined Serie B club Cremonese on loan with an option to purchase. On 24 August 2020, he moved to Cremonese on a permanent basis.

Return to Pescara
On 29 September 2022, Crescenzi returned to Pescara, now in Serie C.

International career
On 25 March 2009, Crescenzi made his debut with the Italy U-21 squad in a friendly match against Austria.

References

External links
 

Living people
1991 births
People from Marino, Lazio
Footballers from Lazio
Association football fullbacks
Italian footballers
Italy youth international footballers
Italy under-21 international footballers
A.S. Roma players
F.C. Grosseto S.S.D. players
F.C. Crotone players
S.S.C. Bari players
Delfino Pescara 1936 players
Novara F.C. players
AC Ajaccio players
A.C. Perugia Calcio players
Hellas Verona F.C. players
U.S. Cremonese players
Serie A players
Serie B players
Ligue 1 players
Italian expatriate footballers
Expatriate footballers in France
Mediterranean Games silver medalists for Italy
Mediterranean Games medalists in football
Competitors at the 2009 Mediterranean Games
Sportspeople from the Metropolitan City of Rome Capital